Spelthorne Sports F.C. is a football club based in the borough of Spelthorne.

History

Spelthorne Sports Football Club, nicknamed The Spelly, was formed in 1922. The team won the Surrey Elite Intermediate League in the 2010–11 season, gaining promotion to Division One of the Combined Counties League. As well as winning the Surrey Elite Intermediate League title in 2011, the club also won the League Challenge Cup, beating Ripley F.C. in the final.

In 2013–14 The Spelly won the Middlesex FA Intermediate Cup, beating Middlesex County Premier side Cricklewood Wanderers 3–0 in the Final. 
Second half goals from Robert Smith (2), and Lee Staples ensured the victory. The match played at North Greenford United on 26 March 2014.
On 16 April 2014, Spelthorne Sports were crowned Combined Counties Division One Champions with a 2–1 win away to Epsom Athletic. They lifted the trophy 3 days later following an emphatic 7–0 win at home to local rivals Staines Lammas.
The Spelly also won the RPM Records Division One Challenge Cup against Staines Lammas at Windsor FC on 5 May 2014. 
A single second half Lee Staples goal was enough to make sure The Spelly lifted the trophy, winning the league and cup treble in the process.

The team went on a phenomenal 46 game unbeaten run in all competitions that season, beating teams in cup competitions from higher divisions such as Frimley Green, Staines Town (on pens), Walton Casuals, Wembley, and Epsom & Ewell (on pens).
That unbeaten run finally came to an end on 7 May 2014 when they played Combined Counties Premier Division side Hanworth Villa in the Southern Combination Cup Final, losing 1–0. The game was played at home and marked the club's first ever game under the newly installed floodlights. 
The lads then suffered their second defeat of the season to the same opposition when the sides met again 3 days later in the Cherry Red Records Premier Challenge Cup Final, again losing 1–0.

The 2013–14 season was extremely successful for Spelthorne Sports. Winning two cup finals, and finishing runners-up in another two cup finals.
However the biggest achievement by far was winning the league without losing a single game in the process. 
Winning 22, drawing 8, losing 0, scoring 92, and conceding 23.

In the 2018–19 FA Vase, Spelthorne Sports were drawn against de facto reserve side AFC Spelthorne Sports, winning 4–1.

Ground

Their home ground is the Spelthorne Sports Club, 296 Staines Road West, Ashford Common, Ashford, Middlesex TW15 1RY.

The ground does have floodlights, along with a covered seating area holding 50 seats behind the goal at the clubhouse end. On 2 April 2014 the club passed the necessary ground grading inspection which means it is at the grade 'G' required for playing at step six of the National League System,.

Staff
1st Team Manager – Mark Harper
1st Team Coach/Assistant Manager – Daren Bulman
1st Assistant Manager - Andrew Viney
Club Physio –

Honours

League honours
Surrey Elite Intermediate League
Champions: 2010–11
Combined Counties League Division One
Champions: 2013–14

Cup honours
Southern Combination Cup
 Runners up: 2012–13, 2013–14
Middlesex FA Intermediate Cup
 Winners: 2013–14
RPM Records Division One Challenge Cup
 Winners: 2013–14
Cherry Red Records Premier Challenge Cup
 Runners up: 2013–14

References

External links
 Spelthorne Sports F.C. official website

Football clubs in Surrey
Football clubs in England
Association football clubs established in 1922
1922 establishments in England
Surrey Elite Intermediate Football League
Combined Counties Football League
Borough of Spelthorne